Glutamate-cysteine ligase regulatory subunit is an enzyme that in humans is encoded by the GCLM gene.

Glutamate-cysteine ligase, also known as gamma-glutamylcysteine synthetase, is the first rate limiting enzyme of glutathione synthesis. The enzyme consists of two subunits, a heavy catalytic subunit and a light regulatory subunit. Gamma glutamylcysteine synthetase deficiency has been implicated in some forms of hemolytic anemia.

References

Further reading